Dawn Coe-Jones (October 19, 1960 – November 12, 2016) was a Canadian professional golfer who played on the LPGA Tour, and a member of the Canadian Golf Hall of Fame. She was the first female Canadian golfer to surpass $1million in career earnings, announcing the arrival of Canadian female golfers upon the world stage in the 1990s.

Early years
Coe-Jones was born in Campbell River, British Columbia. Growing up in Lake Cowichan on Vancouver Island, she worked as a teenager at March Meadows Golf Course in Honeymoon Bay.

She had an outstanding amateur career, scoring back-to-back wins in the B.C. Junior tournament in 1978 and 1979 and the B.C. Amateur in 1982 and 1983. She capped her 1983 season with the Canadian Women's Amateur title and won NCAA all-American honours at Lamar University. She won a scholarship in her sophomore year and graduated in 1983 with a degree in elementary education.

Professional career
Her first LPGA win came at the Women's Kemper Open in 1992. Coe-Jones was accompanied by caddie and childhood friend Kelly Feltrin, who was on her bag when she won the Kemper. She went on to claim the 1994 LPGA Palm Beach Classic and 1995 Tournament of Champions. Her best score ever was 63 at the Safeco Classic in 1998. In 1993, she became the first female golfer to sink an albatross in a women's major.

Coe-Jones played on the LPGA Tour from 1984 to 2008, winning three tournaments, and over $3 million in career earnings. She competed in over 20 Canadian Women's Opens. Her best chance to win her national open was in 1993, when she was third behind Brandie Burton and Betsy King at London Hunt. She tied for fourth with Canadian Gail Graham in 1998 in Windsor, Ontario.

Coe-Jones made her farewell appearance at the CN Canadian Open in 2008, finishing 14-over after two rounds and missing the cut.

Personal
She competed under her maiden name, Dawn Coe, until her marriage to Jimmy Jones in November 1992. She moved to Tampa from Texas in 1992 to be near the man she would marry that year, Jimmy Jones, and friends from the tour. Their son James was born three years later.

Coe-Jones' favourite hockey team growing up was the Montreal Canadiens, but after living in Florida for many years she adopted the Tampa Bay Lightning. She was present for their 2004 Stanley Cup victory.

Death
She died of chondrosarcoma, a form of bone cancer at a hospice on November 12, 2016, near her home in Tampa, Florida, aged 56.

She is survived by her husband, Jimmy, son, Jimmy, in-laws Sandy and General James Jones, and brothers Mark and John Coe. Her son is a college golfer at the University of South Florida and winner of the 2015 Florida State Amateur.

Legacy
The inaugural Dawn Coe-Jones Golf Classic was held in October 2016 to raise funds for Sarcoma research in her name.

Honours
Coe-Jones was inducted into the Canadian Golf Hall of Fame in 2003, and the B.C. Sports Hall of Fame in 2013.

Amateur wins (5)
1978 British Columbia Junior
1979 British Columbia Junior
1982 British Columbia Amateur
1983 British Columbia Amateur, Canadian Women's Amateur

Professional wins (4)

LPGA Tour wins (3)

LPGA Tour playoff record (0–1)

Other wins (1)
1992 Pizza-La LPGA Matchplay Championship

Team appearances
Professional
World Cup (representing Canada): 2005
Handa Cup (representing World team): 2006, 2007, 2008, 2009, 2010, 2011, 2012 (tie), 2014

See also
1990s wave of Canadian female golfers on the LPGA Tour
 Jennifer Wyatt
 Gail Graham
 Lisa Walters
 Tina Tombs
 Lorie Kane

References

External links

Dawn Coe-Jones at the Canadian Golf Hall of Fame

Canadian female golfers
Lamar Lady Cardinals golfers
LPGA Tour golfers
Golfing people from British Columbia
Golfers from Tampa, Florida
Canadian expatriates in the United States
Deaths from bone cancer
Deaths from cancer in Florida
1960 births
2016 deaths